The Golden Jubilee of George III, also known as the Grand National Jubilee, on 25 October 1809 marked 49 years of King George III's accession to the British throne, and his entrance into the 50th year of his reign. It was the first of such festivities to be celebrated in a significant way in the United Kingdom and the Colonies. The celebrations were relatively limited compared to the jubilees of some of the ensuing British monarchs.

History
In March 1809 and with jubilee celebrations approaching, prices for candles began to rise as indoor celebrations were anticipated. Festivities in India began on 4 June, the King's official birthday, with the governor throwing a fête in Bombay, which was attended by ambassadors from within the Indian Empire and those from surrounding countries. The celebrations in the United Kingdom started with a ball at the Town Hall on 24 October 1809. The following day, the King and the Queen, along with the Duke of York, Princess Elizabeth, and the Duke of Sussex, marked the event with a private service at St George's Chapel, Windsor Castle and the King inspected a troop of soldiers, though he was not able to take part in most of the ensuing celebrations due to his declining health. The Royal Horse Guards organised an ox roast in Bachelors' Acre, Windsor, ⁣ which was attended by the Queen, the Duke of York, the Duke of Kent, Princess Elizabeth, the Duke of Cumberland, and the Duke of Sussex, who were later joined by the Prince of Wales and Princess Charlotte of Wales. The Guildhall had built a massive ornate arch across the road, which the royal family and the accompanying party passed through as they entered town. "A grand fête and firework display" at Frogmore was planned and attended by the Queen, accompanied by the dukes of York, Clarence, and Sussex, and the princesses Augusta, Elizabeth, and Sophia. Among other attendees were the Earl of Uxbridge, the Earl and Countess Harcourt, the Earl and Countess of Cardigan, and lords St Helens and Walsingham.

Shops were closed to allow for people's participation in festivities and the Lord Mayor of London and the City of London Corporation took part in a procession to St Paul's Cathedral, which culminated in a service of thanksgiving and later a dinner at the Mansion House. Around 400 merchants and bankers met at the Merchant Taylors' Hall, where they were joined by the earls of Westmorland, Chatham, Bathurst, Camden, Liverpool, St Vincent, as well as lords Harrowby, Mulgrave, Berkshire. A number of children were christened Jubilee George or Jubilee Charlotte in honour of the King and Queen.

Military deserters and prisoners of war were pardoned and debtors were discharged, excluding those who were of French origin due to the ongoing Napoleonic Wars. Among landmarks commissioned to mark the occasion were a monument erected in Windsor and unveiled in the presence of the Queen, the King's Statue in Weymouth, the Jubilee Rock in Blisland, and the Jubilee Tower in Moel Famau. A special series of jugs were also produced in Liverpool to commemorate the jubilee. Two sets of medals were also struck, the King George III Jubilee Medal and the King George III and Queen Charlotte Jubilee Medal.

See also
 Grand Jubilee of 1814
 Golden Jubilee of Queen Victoria
 Golden Jubilee of Elizabeth II

References

1809 in the United Kingdom
British royal jubilees
George III of the United Kingdom
Golden jubilees
October 1809 events